The 2022 Firestone Grand Prix of Monterey was the seventeenth and final race of the 2022 IndyCar season. The race was held on September 11, 2022, in Monterey, California at the WeatherTech Raceway Laguna Seca. The race consisted of 95 laps and was won by Álex Palou. Will Power claimed his second IndyCar Series championship with his third place finish in this race.

Entry list

Practice

Practice 1

Practice 2

Qualifying

Qualifying classification 

 Notes
 Bold text indicates fastest time set in session.

Warmup

Race 
The race started at 3:30 PM ET on September 11, 2022.

Race classification

Championship standings after the race 

Drivers' Championship standings

Engine manufacturer standings

 Note: Only the top five positions are included.

Footnotes

References

Monterey Grand Prix
Firestone Grand Prix of Monterey
Firestone Grand Prix of Monterey
Firestone Grand Prix of Monterey
Firestone Grand Prix of Monterey